The Visible Man is a David Byrne remix album released in 1997. It includes nine remixes of six songs from his previous studio album, Feelings. In his All Music review Christian Huey said "A few bright spots manage to shine through this otherwise standard remix album."

Track listing
"Fuzzy Freaky" – 6:53 (remixed by DJ Food)
"Fuzzy Freaky" – 2:50 (remixed by Mark Walk & Ruby)
"Wicked Little Doll" – 4:11 (remixed by New Kingdom)
"Dance on Vaseline" – 5:50 (remixed by Thievery Corp.)
"You Don't Know Me" – 5:50 (remixed by B-boy 3000)
"You Don't Know Me" – 5:00 (remixed by Lloop)
"Miss America" – 5:40 (remixed by Cecco Music)
"Miss America" – 5:54 (remixed by Mark Saunders & DB)
"Amnesia" – 5:20 (remixed by Rea Mochiach)

References

External links

1997 remix albums
David Byrne remix albums
Luaka Bop remix albums